Dominic Ballard (born 1 April 2005) is an English professional footballer who plays as a forward for Southampton.

Club career
Ballard signed his first professional contract with Southampton in April 2022. 

On 23 August 2022, in the Carabao Cup, he made his senior debut and scored his first goal for Southampton's first team in a 3–0 win at Cambridge United in the EFL Cup.

International career
Having previously represented England U17s, Ballard made his U18 debut during a 1-0 win over the  Netherlands in Pinatar on 21 September 2022.

Career statistics

Club

Notes

References

2005 births
Living people
English footballers
England youth international footballers
Association football forwards
Southampton F.C. players